This is a list of extant snakes, given by their common names. Note that the snakes are grouped by name, and in some cases the grouping may have no scientific basis.

A 
 Viper Adder
 Common adder
 Death Adder
 Desert death adder
 Horned adder
 Long-nosed adder
 Many-horned adder
 Mountain adder
 Mud adder
 Namaqua dwarf adder
 Peringuey's adder
 Puff adder
 African puff adder
 Rhombic night adder
 Sand adder
 Dwarf sand adder
 Namib dwarf sand adder
 Water adder
 Aesculapian snake
 Anaconda
 Bolivian anaconda
 De Schauensee's anaconda
 Green anaconda
 Yellow anaconda
 Arafura file snake
 Asp
 European asp
 Egyptian asp
 African beaked snake

B 
 Ball Python
 Bird snake
 Black-headed snake
 Mexican black kingsnake
 Black rat snake
 Black snake
 Red-bellied black snake
 Blind snake
 Brahminy blind snake
 Texas blind snake
 Western blind snake
 Boa
 Abaco Island boa
 Amazon tree boa
 Boa constrictor
 Cuban boa
 Dumeril's boa
 Dwarf boa
 Emerald tree boa
 Hogg Island boa
 Jamaican boa
 Madagascar ground boa
 Madagascar tree boa
 Puerto Rican boa
 Rainbow boa
 Red-tailed boa
 Rosy boa
 Rubber boa
 Sand boa
 Tree boa
 Boiga
 Boomslang
 Brown snake
 Eastern brown snake
 Bull snake
 Bushmaster
 Dwarf beaked snake
 Rufous beaked snake

C 

 Canebrake
 Cantil
 Cascabel
 Cat-eyed snake
 Banded cat-eyed snake
 Green cat-eyed snake
 Cat snake
 Andaman cat snake
 Beddome's cat snake
 Dog-toothed cat snake
 Forsten's cat snake
 Gold-ringed cat snake
 Gray cat snake
 Many-spotted cat snake
 Nicobar cat snake
 Sri Lanka cat snake
 Tawny cat snake
 Chicken snake
 Coachwhip snake
 Cobra
 Andaman cobra
 Arabian cobra
 Asian cobra
 Banded water cobra
 Black-necked cobra
 Black-necked spitting cobra
 Black tree cobra
 Burrowing cobra
 Cape cobra
 Caspian cobra
 Chinese cobra
 Cobra de capello
 Congo water cobra
 Common cobra
 Eastern water cobra
 Egyptian cobra
 Equatorial spitting cobra
 False cobra
 False water cobra
 Forest cobra
 Gold tree cobra
 Indian cobra
 Indochinese spitting cobra
 Javan spitting cobra
 King cobra
 Mandalay cobra
 Monocled cobra
 Monoculate cobra
 Mozambique spitting cobra
 North Philippine cobra
 Nubian spitting cobra
 Philippine cobra
 Red spitting cobra
 Rinkhals cobra
 Shield-nosed cobra
 Sinai desert cobra
 Southern Indonesian spitting cobra
 Southern Philippine cobra
 Southwestern black spitting cobra
 Snouted cobra
 Spectacled cobra
 Spitting cobra
 Storm water cobra
 Thai cobra
 Taiwan cobra
 West African brown spitting cobra
 White-lipped cobra
 Yellow cobra
 Zebra spitting cobra
 Collett's snake
 Congo snake
 Copperhead
 American copperhead
 Australian copperhead
 Coral snake
 Arizona coral snake
 Beddome's coral snake
 Brazilian coral snake
 Cape coral snake
 Eastern coral snake
 False coral snake
 Harlequin coral snake
 High Woods coral snake
 Malayan long-glanded coral snake
 Texas Coral Snake
 Western coral snake
 Corn snake
 South eastern corn snake
 Cottonmouth
 Crowned snake
 Cuban wood snake

E 
 Eastern hognose snake
 Egg-eater
 Indian egg-eater
 Eyelash viper
 Eastern coral snake

F 
 Fer-de-lance
 Fierce snake
 Fishing snake
 Flying snake
 Golden tree snake
 Indian flying snake
 Moluccan flying snake
 Ornate flying snake
 Paradise flying snake
 Twin-Barred tree snake
 Banded Flying Snake
 Fox snake, three species of Pantherophis
 Forest flame snake

G 
 Garter snake
 Checkered garter snake
 Common garter snake
 San Francisco garter snake
 Texas garter snake
 Glossy snake
 Gopher snake
 Cape gopher snake
 Grass snake
 Green snake
 Rough green snake
 Smooth green snake
 Ground snake
 Common ground snake
 Three-lined ground snake
 Western ground snake

H 
 Habu
 Himehabu
 Okinawan habu
 Sakishima habu
 Tokara habu
 Harlequin snake
 Elaps harlequin snake
 Herald snake
 Hognose snake
 Blonde hognose snake
 Dusty hognose snake
 Eastern hognose snake
 Jan's hognose snake
 Giant Malagasy hognose snake
 Mexican hognose snake
 Plains hognose snake
 Ringed hognose snake
 South American hognose snake
 Southern hognose snake
 Speckled hognose snake
 Tri-color hognose snake
 Western hognose snake
 Hoop snake
 Hundred pacer

I 
 Ikaheka snake
Indigo snake

J 
 Jamaican Tree Snake
 Jararacussu

K 
 Keelback
 Andrea's keelback
 Asian keelback
 Assam keelback
 Black-striped keelback
 Buff striped keelback
 Burmese keelback
 Checkered keelback
 Common keelback
 Hill keelback
 Himalayan keelback
 Khasi Hills keelback
 Modest keelback
 Nicobar Island keelback
 Nilgiri keelback
 Orange-collared keelback
 Red-necked keelback
 Sikkim keelback
 Speckle-bellied keelback
 Tiger keelback
 Wall's keelback
 White-lipped keelback
 Wynaad keelback
 Yunnan keelback
 King brown
 King cobra
 King snake
 California kingsnake
 Desert kingsnake
 Grey-banded kingsnake
 North eastern king snake
 Prairie kingsnake
 Scarlet kingsnake
 Speckled kingsnake
 Krait
 Banded krait
 Blue krait
 Black krait
 Burmese krait
 Ceylon krait
 Indian krait
 Lesser black krait
 Malayan krait
 Many-banded krait
 Northeastern hill krait
 Red-headed krait
 Sind krait
 South Andaman krait
Suzhen's krait

L 
 Large shield snake
 Lancehead
 Common lancehead
 Lora
 Grey Lora
 Lyre snake
 Baja California lyresnake
 Central American lyre snake
 Texas lyre snake
 Eastern lyre snake

M 
 Machete savane
 Mamba
 Black mamba
 Green mamba
 Eastern green mamba
 Western green mamba
 Mamushi
 Mangrove snake
 Milk snake
 Moccasin snake
 Montpellier snake
 Mud snake
 Eastern mud snake
 Western mud snake
 Mussurana

N 
 Night snake
 Cat-eyed night snake
 Texas night snake
 Nichell snake
 Narrowhead Garter Snake
 Nose-horned viper
 Rhinoceros viper
 Vipera ammodytes

P 
 Parrot snake
 Mexican parrot snake
 Patchnose snake
 Perrotet's shieldtail snake
 Pine snake
 Pipe snake
 Asian pipe snake
 Dwarf pipe snake
 Red-tailed pipe snake
 Python
 African rock python
 Amethystine python
 Angolan python
 Australian scrub python
 Ball python
 Bismarck ringed python
 Black headed python
 Blood python
 Boelen python
 Borneo short-tailed python
 Bredl's python
 Brown water python
 Burmese python
 Calabar python
 Western carpet python
 Centralian carpet python
 Coastal carpet python
 Inland carpet python
 Jungle carpet python
 New Guinea carpet python
 Northwestern carpet python
 Southwestern carpet python
 Children's python
 Dauan Island water python
 Desert woma python
 Diamond python
 Flinders python
 Green tree python
 Halmahera python
 Indian python
 Indonesian water python
 Macklot's python
 Moluccan python
 Oenpelli python
 Olive python
 Papuan python
 Pygmy python
 Red blood python
 Reticulated python
 Kayaudi dwarf reticulated python
 Selayer reticulated python
 Rough-scaled python
 Royal python
 Savu python
 Spotted python
 Stimson's python
 Sumatran short-tailed python
 Tanimbar python
 Timor python
 Wetar Island python
 White-lipped python
 Brown white-lipped python
 Northern white-lipped python
 Southern white-lipped python
 Woma python
 Western woma python

Q 
 Queen snake

R 
 Racer
 Bimini racer
 Buttermilk racer
 Eastern racer
 Eastern yellowbelly sad racer
 Mexican racer
 Southern black racer
 Tan racer
 West Indian racer
 Raddysnake
 Southwestern blackhead snake
 Rat snake
 Baird's rat snake
 Beauty rat snake
 Great Plains rat snake
 Green rat snake
 Japanese forest rat snake
 Japanese rat snake
 King rat snake
 Mandarin rat snake
 Persian rat snake
 Red-backed rat snake
 Twin-spotted rat snake
 Yellow-striped rat snake
 Manchurian Black Water Snake
 Rattlesnake
 Arizona black rattlesnake
 Aruba rattlesnake
 Chihuahuan ridge-nosed rattlesnake
 Coronado Island rattlesnake
 Durango rock rattlesnake
 Dusky pigmy rattlesnake
 Eastern diamondback rattlesnake
 Grand Canyon rattlesnake
 Great Basin rattlesnake
 Hopi rattlesnake
 Lance-headed rattlesnake
 Long-tailed rattlesnake
 Massasauga rattlesnake
 Mexican green rattlesnake
 Mexican west coast rattlesnake
 Midget faded rattlesnake
 Mojave rattlesnake
 Northern black-tailed rattlesnake
 Oaxacan small-headed rattlesnake
 Rattler
 Red diamond rattlesnake
 Southern Pacific rattlesnake
 Southwestern speckled rattlesnake
 Tancitaran dusky rattlesnake
 Tiger rattlesnake
 Timber rattlesnake
 Tropical rattlesnake
 Twin-spotted rattlesnake
 Uracoan rattlesnake
 Western diamondback rattlesnake
 Ribbon snake
 Rinkhals
 River jack

S 
 Sea snake
 Annulated sea snake
 Beaked sea snake
 Dubois's sea snake
 Hardwicke's sea snake
 Hook Nosed Sea Snake
 Olive sea snake
 Pelagic sea snake
 Stoke's sea snake
 Yellow-banded sea snake
 Yellow-bellied sea snake
 Yellow-lipped sea snake
 Shield-tailed snake
 Sidewinder
 Colorado desert sidewinder
 Mojave desert sidewinder
 Sonoran sidewinder
 Small-eyed snake
 Smooth snake
 Brazilian smooth snake
 European smooth snake
 Stiletto snake
 Striped snake
 Japanese striped snake
 Sunbeam snake

T 
 Taipan
 Central ranges taipan
 Coastal taipan
 Inland taipan
 Paupan taipan
 Tentacled snake
 Tic polonga
 Tiger snake
 Chappell Island tiger snake
 Common tiger snake
 Down's tiger snake
 Eastern tiger snake
 King Island tiger snake
 Krefft's tiger snake
 Peninsula tiger snake
 Tasmanian tiger snake
 Western tiger snake
 Tigre snake
 Tree snake
 Blanding's tree snake
 Blunt-headed tree snake
 Brown tree snake
 Long-nosed tree snake
 Many-banded tree snake
 Northern tree snake
 Trinket snake
 Black-banded trinket snake
 Twig snake
 African twig snake
 Twin Headed King Snake
 Titanoboa

U 

 Urutu

V 
 Vine snake
 Asian Vine Snake, Whip Snake
 American Vine Snake
 Mexican vine snake
 Viper
 Asp viper
 Bamboo viper
 Bluntnose viper
 Brazilian mud Viper
 Burrowing viper
 Bush viper
 Great Lakes bush viper
 Hairy bush viper
 Nitsche's bush viper
 Rough-scaled bush viper
 Spiny bush viper
 Carpet viper
 Crossed viper
 Cyclades blunt-nosed viper
 Eyelash viper
 False horned viper
 Fea's viper
 Fifty pacer
 Gaboon viper
 Hognosed viper
 Horned desert viper
 Horned viper
 Jumping viper
 Kaznakov's viper
 Leaf-nosed viper
 Leaf viper
 Levant viper
 Long-nosed viper
 McMahon's viper
 Mole viper
 Nose-horned viper
 Rhinoceros viper
 Vipera ammodytes
 Palestine viper
 Pallas' viper
 Palm viper
 Amazonian palm viper
 Black-speckled palm-pitviper
 Eyelash palm-pitviper
 Green palm viper
 Mexican palm-pitviper
 Guatemalan palm viper
 Honduran palm viper
 Siamese palm viper
 Side-striped palm-pitviper
 Yellow-lined palm viper
 Pit viper
 Banded pitviper
 Bamboo pitviper
 Barbour's pit viper
 Black-tailed horned pit viper
 Bornean pitviper
 Brongersma's pitviper
 Brown spotted pitviper
 Cantor's pitviper
 Elegant pitviper
 Eyelash pit viper
 Fan-Si-Pan horned pitviper
 Flat-nosed pitviper
 Godman's pit viper
 Green tree pit viper
 Habu pit viper
 Hagen's pitviper
 Horseshoe pitviper
 Jerdon's pitviper
 Kanburian pit viper
 Kaulback's lance-headed pitviper
 Kham Plateau pitviper
 Large-eyed pitviper
 Malabar rock pitviper
 Malayan pit viper
 Mangrove pit viper
 Mangshan pitviper
 Motuo bamboo pitviper
 Nicobar bamboo pitviper
 Philippine pitviper
 Pointed-scaled pit viper
 Red-tailed bamboo pitviper
 Schultze's pitviper
 Stejneger's bamboo pitviper
 Sri Lankan pit viper
 Temple pit viper
 Tibetan bamboo pitviper
 Tiger pit viper
 Undulated pit viper
 Wagler's pit viper
 Wirot's pit viper
 Portuguese viper
 Rhinoceros viper
 River jack
 Russell's viper
 Sand viper
 Saw-scaled viper
 Schlegel's viper
 Sedge viper
 Sharp-nosed viper
 Snorkel viper
 Temple viper
 Tree viper
 Chinese tree viper
 Guatemalan tree viper
 Hutton's tree viper
 Indian tree viper
 Large-scaled tree viper
 Malcolm's tree viper
 Nitsche's tree viper
 Pope's tree viper
 Rough-scaled tree viper
 Rungwe tree viper
 Sumatran tree viper
 White-lipped tree viper
 Ursini's viper
 Western hog-nosed viper

W 
 Wart snake
 Water moccasin
 Water snake
 Bocourt's water snake
 Northern water snake
 Whip snake
 Long-nosed whip snake
 Wolf snake
 African wolf snake
 Barred wolf snake
 Worm snake
 Common worm snake
 Longnosed worm snake
 Wutu

X

Y 
 Yarara

Z 
 Zebra snake

See also 
 List of snakes, overview of snake families and genera.
 List of reptiles, overview of reptile orders and families.

References 

Common name

th:รายชื่องู